The Roundup: No Way Out is an upcoming South Korean crime action film directed by Lee Sang-yong, starring Ma Dong-seok and Lee Jun-hyeok. It is the third installment of Crime City series that started with The Outlaws (2017), followed by The Roundup (2022). It is scheduled to be released in 2023.

Premise 
Detective Ma Seok-do joins the Metropolitan Investigation Team, to eradicate Joo Seong-cheol and other Japanese gangsters from committing heinous crimes in Korea.

Cast 
 Ma Dong-seok as Ma Seok-do
 Lee Joon-hyuk as Joo Seong-cheol
 Munetaka Aoki as Riki Yakuza
 Lee Beom-soo as Jang Tae-soo
 Kim Min-jae as Kim Man-jae
 Lee Ji-hoon as Yang Jong-soo
 Jeon Seok-ho as Kim Yang-ho
 Ko Kyu-pil as Cho rong-i
 Park Ji-hwan as Jang I-soo
 Bae So-young
 Park Sang-nam
 Kang Yoon
 Lee Hye-ji
 Yeon Ye-rim

Special appearance 
 Jun Kunimura as Ichizō

Production 
In May, 2022, Lee Joon-hyuk was reported to play the new villain in the third installment of Crime City series. In an interview in June 2022, Lee Sang-yong revealed that he is currently auditioning for Crime City 3. Principal photography began on July 20, 2022. On November 15, 2022, Ma Dong-seok posted on Instagram that the filming of The Roundup: No Way Out has ended.

References

External links
 
 
 
 

Upcoming films
2020s South Korean films
2020s Korean-language films
South Korean crime action films
South Korean gangster films
South Korean police films
South Korean sequel films
Yakuza films